Esfinge (born June 14, 1993 in Guadalajara, Jalisco, Mexico) is the ring name of a Mexican Luchador enmascarado, or masked professional wrestler, currently working for the Mexican Consejo Mundial de Lucha Libre (CMLL) wrestling promotion. Esfinge's real name is not a matter of public record, as is often the case with masked wrestlers in Mexico where their private lives are kept a secret from the wrestling fans. He is the son of professional wrestler Magnum and the grand son of wrestler "Halcon Furia" and has previously also worked under the name "Halcon Furia Jr." Esfinge is Spanish for Sphinx.

Professional wrestling career
The wrestler later known as Esfinge made his in-ring debut in late 2009, wrestling under the ring name "Halcón Furia Jr.", the same name his uncle used for years and was an homage to his grandfather who was the original Halcón Furia. In 2011 he was given a new ring identity, name and mask becoming "Esfinge" a character with Egyptian inspiration. Due to the secretive nature of masked wrestlers in Mexico Consejo Mundial de Lucha Libre (CMLL), the professional wrestling promotion that Esfinge works for lists his debut as September 13, 2011, the debut of the Esfinge character. In September, 2012 Esfinge was one of eight Guadalajara, Jalisco based wrestlers working for CMLL who competed in a Steel cage match, in which the last wrestler in the cage would be forced to unmask under Luchas de Apuestas, or "Bet match" rules. In the end Metatrón, Infierno, Acertijo, Black Metal, Halcon de Plata and Mr. Trueno all escaped the ring, leaving Esfinge to face off against In Memoriam. The match ended when Esfinge defeated In Memoriam, In Memoriam to unmask after the match and reveal his name as per Lucha Libre traditions. Esfinge teamed up with Black Metal to compete in a tournament for the vacant Occidente Tag Team Championship, but the team were defeated in the semi-finals by Sky Kid and Smaker. In early 2014 CMLL held a tournament to determine the next challengers for the Occidente Tag Team Championship, pairing Esfinge up with semi-regular partner El Gallo for the tournament. In the first round the duo defeated Pitbull I and Pitbull II, in the second round they defeated Mr. Trueno and Rey Trueno and finally Exterminador and Malefico in the finals to earn a match for the championship. On February 28, 2015 Esfinge and El Gallo defeated Olímpico and Boby Zavala to win the championship. On May 12, 2015 they successfully defended the championship against the CMLL Arena Coliseo Tag Team Champions La Comando Caribeño (Misterioso Jr. and Sagrado).

In May, 2015 Esfinge competed in a qualifying match for the 2015 version of the En Busca de un Ídolo ("In Search of an Idol") tournament as one of 16 wrestlers in the qualifying torneo cibernetico elimination match where the last eight wrestlers would qualify for the tournament. Esfinge competed against Akuma, Blue Panther Jr., Cancerbero, Canelo Casas, Delta, Disturbio, Flyer, El Gallo, Guerrero Maya Jr., Joker, Pegasso, Raziel, Sagrado, Stigma and Boby Zavala. Esfinge would eliminate Stigma during the match and become one of the eight survivors to qualify for the main portion of the tournament. Esfinge was one of 12 wrestlers that risked their mask in a steel cage match that took place on June 12 in Guadalajara. The match itself came down to Esfinge and Espectrum being the last two wrestlers in the cage, with Esfinge pinning Espectrum to win the match and the mask of his opponent. On June 21, as part of a special "Father's day" torneo cibernetico Esfinge teamed up with his father Magnum, defeating the father/son combos of Ráfaga and Ráfaga Jr, El Yaqui and Nube Roja, Linterna Verde Jr. and Toro Negro, Furia Roja and Furia Roja Jr., Centella and Évola to win the match. During the first round of the tournament Esfinge defeated Canelo Casas, Disturbio, Flyer and Guerrero Maya Jr., earning 80 points out of a possible 140. Esfinge was the first competitor to earn a "perfect 10" from a judge as the very critical El Tirantes gave him a 10 on June 12 after his victor over Blue Panther Jr., he later received further perfect 10 scores from El Felino. Diamante Azul and Atlantis (twice) making him the only wrestler in the 2015 tournament to get five such scores. He got a total of 197 points from the judges. In the first week Esfinge got the full 40 points from the fan polls, but in subsequent weeks of voting had more mixed results ranging from 2 points to 18 points to get a total of 116 points from the polls. With a total of 393 point Esfinge finished third in the first round, qualifying for the second round. On December 25, 2015 as part of CMLL's annual Infierno en el Ring show Esfinge was one of twelve men risking their mask in the main event steel cage match. He was the first man to leave the cage, keeping his mask safe in the process. On April 5, 2016 Esfinge teamed up with veteran wrestler Volador Jr. for the 2016 Gran Alternativa tournament, defeating Fujin and Rey Escorpión in the finals to win the entire tournament. On December 5, 2017, Esfinge won his first singles title when he defeated Puma to win the Occidente Light Heavyweight Championship

Ring of Honor

In early October 2017, it was announced that Esfinge, along with fellow CMLL luchador Rey Cometa were debuting for the American promotion Ring of Honor due to CMLL's working relationship with Ring of Honor during the 2017 Survival of the Fittest three-night tours where on the first night in San Antonio they will fight The Dawgs (Will Ferrara and Rhett Titus) and in the second night in Dallas, the team will challenge for the ROH World Tag Team Championship against The Motor City Machine Guns (Chris Sabin and Alex Shelley) He and Cometa were successful in defeating The Dawgs on the first night but were unsuccessful in their title challenge

Championships and accomplishments
Consejo Mundial de Lucha Libre
CMLL Arena Coliseo Tag Team Championship (1 time) – with Tritón
Mexican National Tag Team Championship (1 time, current) – with Fugaz
Occidente Light Heavyweight Championship (1 time, current)
Occidente Tag Team Championship (1 time, current) - with El Gallo
La Copa Junior: 2016Torneo Gran Alternativa'': 2016 – with Volador Jr.

Luchas de Apuestas record

Footnotes

References

1993 births
Mexican male professional wrestlers
Masked wrestlers
Living people
Professional wrestlers from Jalisco
People from Guadalajara, Jalisco
Unidentified wrestlers
21st-century professional wrestlers
Mexican National Tag Team Champions